is a manga written and illustrated by Mio Tennohji. The manga was published in Japan by Libre Publishing. It is licensed in North America by 801 Media, as one of 801 Media's earliest titles.

Reception

Holly Ellingwood characterises the manga as being more explicit than previous yaoi manga releases, but feels that there is enough character development to carry the story and render it romantic. Hannah Santiago, writing for the appendix to Manga: The Complete Guide, felt that the romance was realistically developed and appreciated the equality in their relationship. June Shimonshi, writing for Library Journal describes the manga as "formulaic" and as being solely driven by sex, finding the word balloons and panels difficult to follow.  Shimonshi recommends Love Mode and the Finder series for those looking for explicit yaoi instead of this manga.

References

External links

2005 manga
School life in anime and manga
Yaoi anime and manga
Digital Manga Publishing titles